The Joint Staff Headquarters (reporting name:JS HQ), is the joint-field operations secretariat and principal headquarters of the Joint Chiefs of Staff Committee established after Indo-Pakistani War of 1971 in Rawalpindi. It is situated next to the General Headquarters of the Pakistan Army. The JS HQ served as the principle headquarters of Pakistan Armed Forces and concerned authorities relating the defence and strategic developments.

The JS HQ was set up to improve coordination, command, and communication between the three branches of the Pakistan Armed Forces.

Joint Staff Command in Media

See also
 Air Headquarters, Pakistan Air Force
 General Headquarters, Pakistan Army
 Naval Headquarters, Pakistan Navy

References 

Military of Pakistan
Rawalpindi District

Pakistan